Echo (also Bijou, Bijou Station) is an unincorporated community and census-designated place (CDP) in Rapides Parish, Louisiana, United States. It was first listed as a CDP in the 2020 census with a population of 352.

Its ZIP code is 71330.

History
In 1907 a mob lynched Henry Johnson, a middle-aged negro man was taken from jail by a mob of 150 white men, who shot him around 50 times.

Demographics

2020 census

Note: the US Census treats Hispanic/Latino as an ethnic category. This table excludes Latinos from the racial categories and assigns them to a separate category. Hispanics/Latinos can be of any race.

Notes

Unincorporated communities in Rapides Parish, Louisiana
Unincorporated communities in Louisiana
Census-designated places in Rapides Parish, Louisiana
Census-designated places in Louisiana